Interstate 180 (I-180) is a north–south spur highway in Illinois that runs from Princeton to the small town of Hennepin at its southern terminus.

Route description

I-180 begins as a continuation of Illinois Route 71 (IL 71) at a diamond interchange with IL 26 northeast of Hennepin. The interchange is located adjacent to a former steel mill that was most recently operated by ArcelorMittal but closed in 2009 and demolished in 2017. The freeway travels northwest, carrying I-180 and IL 26 in a concurrency, and crosses the Illinois River on the north side of Hennepin to enter Bureau County.

On the west side of the river, IL 26 separates from I-180 and the freeway crosses over IL 29 before splitting at a Y interchange. I-180 turns north, intersecting an expressway that connects to IL 29, and travels northeast across Big Bureau Creek to intersect IL 26. The freeway intersects US Route 6 (US 6) east of Princeton and continues due north to its terminus, a trumpet interchange with I-80. I-180 has four lanes for most of its length, though an additional  southbound lane exists prior to the IL 29 exit.

History

Construction of I-180 was completed in 1969. The freeway was built primarily to connect I-80 to a new Jones and Laughlin Steel Company steel plant built in 1965 in Hennepin. However, the steel plant closed soon after I-180 was built and did not reopen until August 2002. Federal auditors criticized its construction and called it a political favor that was put ahead of requests from Tucson, Arizona, and Tacoma, Washington.

I-180 is one of the least traveled Interstates in the nation, serving 1,950–3,600 vehicles per day .

In the 2010s, work started to reconstruct portions of the bridge carrying I-180 over the Illinois River. A three-year project to rebuild the deck began in 2020.

Exit list

References

External links 

Interstate 180 at Kurumi's Roads Page
I-180 at Illinois Highway Ends
Interstate 180 at Roads of the Mid-South and West

80-1
80-1 Illinois
1 Illinois
Transportation in Putnam County, Illinois
Transportation in Bureau County, Illinois